Rajesh Chandrasekar (born ) is an Indian male road and track cyclist. On the road he competed at the 2010 Commonwealth Games. At the track  he competed in the scratch event at the 2013 UCI Track Cycling World Championships.

References

External links
 Profile at cyclingarchives.com

1989 births
Living people
Indian track cyclists
Indian male cyclists
Place of birth missing (living people)
Cyclists at the 2010 Commonwealth Games
Commonwealth Games competitors for India